Créole (Q193) was an  of the French Navy.

Construction and career
Créole was launched on 8 June 1940 at Le Havre, France. To avoid capture by German ground forces advancing on le Havre during the Battle of France, Créole, still unfinished, was towed to La Pallice, and on 18 June 1940 was taken in tow from La Pallice to Swansea in England. France surrendered to Germany and Italy on 22 June 1940, with hostilities ending on 25 June, and on 1 July 1940, the British took custody  of Créole during Operation Catapult.

Créole was completed after the war and commissioned in the French Navy on 1 April 1949. Her silhouette departed from her pre-war design because of the installation of a snorkel and her completion with a sail instead of a conning tower.

Créole took part in the Suez Crisis in 1956, and sustained damage in a friendly fire incident when airplanes from the French aircraft carrier  attacked her by mistake. While she was surfacing on 28 March 1962 during a training cruise, she collided with the French packet boat Sidi Ferruch — which was transporting 800 French troops home from Algeria — off Toulon, France, severely damaging her sail. The dispatch boat Amiral Charner assisted her in reaching port.

Créole eventually was decommissioned, and she was broken up in 1963.

See also
 List of submarines of France

References

External links 
  La Créole surnommé La Locomotive

Aurore-class submarines
World War II submarines of France
Ships built in France
1940 ships
Cold War submarines of France
Maritime incidents in 1962
French submarine accidents